Ecuador elects on the national level a president and a legislature. The President of the Republic and the Vice President are elected on one ballot for a four-year term by the people. The National Assembly (Asamblea Nacional) has 137 members elected for a four-year term in the 24 provinces (so multi-seat constituencies).

Ecuador has a mandatory universal voting system. Citizens who fail to vote are fined. To facilitate universal voting, elections are always held on Sundays and seen as community events where everyone must contribute to the work of voting days.

Presidential elections

Presidential elections in Ecuador are conducted every four years.

Elections use a run off system where a candidate must get over 40% of valid votes and have a minimum 10% lead over the runner up to win in only one round. This is known as winning an "absolute majority".

If no candidate meets those criteria, then the two leading candidates will run against each other in a second election that is held within 45 days off the first election. This stage is known as "Ballotage".

Whoever comes out of Ballotage with more votes will win the presidency.

Past elections

2013 presidential elections

2013 National Assembly elections

See also 
National electoral calendar 2017

External links 
Adam Carr's Election Archive
 Ecuador's Presidential Election: Background on Economic Issues, issue brief from the Center for Economic and Policy Research